"Muscles" is a 1982 hit single written and produced by Michael Jackson, and performed by American singer Diana Ross. It was released as the first single on September 17, 1982 by RCA from Ross's Gold-certified album Silk Electric. The single reached number No. 7 in Cash Box magazine and No. 10 on the Billboard Hot 100 chart. It climbed as high as No. 4 on the Billboard Soul chart. The sexy song, which was rumoured to be named after Jackson's pet snake, was written for Ross and her "desire" for a muscle-bound lover. The track featured prominent background vocals by Patti Austin with seasoned session singers Maxine and Julia Waters. It earned Ross a twelfth and latest Grammy Award nomination for Best Female R&B Vocal Performance. (Although Ross has never won a competitive Grammy, she was awarded an honorary Lifetime Achievement Award from NARAS in 2012.) The song was originally intended to be an R&B answer to the massive Olivia Newton-John hit "Physical".

Music video
The single's erotic music video featured Ross in bed dreaming of muscular men. In one scene she is shown floating through the air over a landscape which turns out to be a man's musclebound body. The video features a young Gil Birmingham (The Twilight Saga film series) in one of his first-ever media appearances.

Track listing

 UK vinyl, 12" (12CL 268)
 "Muscles" – 4:36
 "I Am Me" – 3:50

 US vinyl, 12", promo (JD-13382)
 "Muscles" – 6:38
 "I Am Me" – 3:50

 US vinyl, 7" (PB 13348)
 "Muscles" – 3:59
 "I Am Me" – 3:50

 US vinyl, 7", Gold Standard Stereo (GB-13798)
 "Muscles" – 3:59
 "Pieces of Ice" – 3:57

 FR vinyl, 7" (2C 008-86609)
 "Muscles" – 3:59
 "I Am Me" – 3:50

 NE vinyl, 12" (052Z-86609)
 "Muscles" – 4:35
 "I Am Me" – 3:47

 NE vinyl, 7" (1A 006-86609)
 "Muscles" – 3:59
 "I Am Me" – 3:50

Personnel

Diana Ross – lead vocals
Michael Jackson – producer, uncredited background vocals
Ted Jensen at Sterling Sound, NYC – mastering 
Patti Austin – additional backing vocals
Bill Wolfer – synthesizer
Michael Boddicker – synthesizer
Ray Chew – keyboards
Eric Gale – guitar
Yogi Horton – drums

Neil Jason – bass
Denzil Miller – keyboards
Jeff Mironov – guitar
Jonathan Moffett – drums
Julia Tillman Waters – additional backing vocals
Greg Smith – synthesizer
Maxine Willard Waters – additional backing vocals
David Williams – guitar
Nathan Watts – bass

Charts

Cover versions
The song was recorded in 1997 by producer/DJ Peter Rauhofer recording as Club 69 and was a featured single on the Club 69 album Style. The vocals on this version of "Muscles" are performed by singer-songwriter, Suzanne Palmer.

Samples
Lil' Kim sampled "Muscles" for her rap "Diamonds" but it was not included in the final cut of her album The Notorious K.I.M. 
Young Jeezy also sampled "Muscles" for the title track of his album The Inspiration.

References

1982 singles
Diana Ross songs
Songs written by Michael Jackson
Song recordings produced by Michael Jackson
1982 songs
RCA Records singles